In Judaism, a chillul hashem is an act that violates the prohibition in the Torah of desecrating (chillul) the name (hashem) of God. A chillul hashem occurs when a Jew acts immorally in the presence of others, either Jews or Gentiles. Since Judaism believes that Jews are representatives of God and his moral code, when a Jew acts in a shameful manner, they have represented God poorly, thus desecrating his name. Chillul Hashem is the opposite of a Kiddush Hashem ("sanctification of God's name"), the act of bringing honor, respect, and glory to God's name. Kiddush Hashem is often used to mean religious martyrdom. The concept of chillul hashem is prevalent in the Tanakh and is often referenced by modern Jews as a reason to uphold the highest moral standard.

Biblical source 
The general prohibition of desecrating God's name is stated most explicitly in Leviticus: "And you shall not desecrate My Holy name; and I shall be sanctified in the midst of the Children of Israel. I am the Lord who sanctifies you".

In addition, chillul hashem is mentioned extensively in Prophets and Writings, especially in the Book of Ezekiel. The fact that it appears so frequently throughout the Hebrew Bible demonstrates its centrality and severity.

In rabbinic texts 

The obligation to refrain from desecration of God's name is one of the 613 commandments in rabbinical enumeration.

In general, if a Jew is faced with the decision to violate a law in the Torah or to lose their life, the Torah mandates that s/he violate the prohibition rather than give up his/her life. There are three major exceptions to that rule:
 If the prohibition is particularly severe (such as murder, idolatry, adultery), then the person must give up his/her life, rather than violate the prohibition. The most famous example in the Talmud is the story of the woman with seven sons.
 If the person is being forced to violate a prohibition in front of ten other people, the Talmud states that even the smallest commandment may not be violated.
 If the person is faced with the choice of violating a prohibition, even a less severe one, that is currently outlawed by the foreign power, then s/he must give up his life.

The explanation of the last two exceptions is that a public sin or a sin done in reverence to a governmental decree constitutes a chillul hashem. The prohibition of desecrating God's Name is so severe that a Jew is required to die, rather than violate the sin. Some rishonim (medieval commentaries) maintain that the requirement to give up one's life under these circumstances applies only when the individual is being called upon to actively commit a sin. Thus, if one would remain still and allow himself to be used as a projectile to kill another person, rather than give up his own life, that would be permissible.

A chillul hashem can also occur even if a technical prohibition has not been violated. For example, if a Jewish leader or someone perceived to be righteous is seen acting improperly, his/her actions constitute a chillul hashem. Maimonides says that if a scholarly, righteous Jew gets drunk in front of a less learned Jew, it constitutes a chillul hashem. Thus, any time a Torah scholar or rabbi acts improperly in front of others, they have committed a chillul hashem.

Contemporary examples 
By acting as an upstanding and righteous people, and by following the commandments of the Torah, Jews seek to sanctify God's name and fulfill the mandate of being an Or La'goyim, a light unto the nations. As such, the concepts of kiddush hashem and avoiding chillul hashem are often invoked by Orthodox Jews as a reminder to act in an upstanding manner.

The goal of sanctifying God's name is commonly mentioned with reference to the State of Israel. Because Ezekiel calls the Jewish exile a desecration of God's name, Religious Zionists believe that one of the main purposes of the State of Israel is to reverse that state of exile and thereby to bring about a sanctification of God's name. To accomplish that, they believe that Israel, particularly the Israel Defense Forces (IDF), ought to lead the world by example by acting in the most humanitarian way possible.

References

Jewish ethical law
Negative Mitzvoth
Hebrew words and phrases in Jewish law